Parideio Drosias was a Cypriot association football club based in Larnaca. It participated in the 1988–1989 season of the Cypriot Fourth Division.

References

Football clubs in Cyprus